William McChesney Martin Jr. (December 17, 1906 – July 27, 1998) was an American business executive who served as the 9th chairman of the Federal Reserve from 1951 to 1970, making him the longest holder of that position. He was nominated to the post by President Harry S. Truman and reappointed by four of his successors. Martin, who once considered becoming a Presbyterian minister, was described by a Washington journalist as "the happy Puritan".

Early life
William McChesney Martin Jr. was born in St. Louis to William McChesney Martin Sr. and Rebecca Woods. Martin's connection to the Federal Reserve was forged through his family heritage. In 1913, Martin's father was summoned by President Woodrow Wilson and Senator Carter Glass to help write the Federal Reserve Act that would establish the Federal Reserve System on December 23 of that year. His father later served as a governor and then president of the Federal Reserve Bank of St. Louis.

Martin graduated from Yale University, where his formal education was in English and Latin rather than finance. However, he still maintained an intense interest in business through his father. His first job after graduation was at the St. Louis brokerage firm of A. G. Edwards & Sons, where he became a full partner after only two years. From there, Martin's rapid rise in the financial world landed him in 1931 a seat on the New York Stock Exchange (NYSE), just two years after the Wall Street Crash of 1929 at the outset of the Great Depression. Martin pursued graduate study in Economics at Columbia University from 1931 to 1937; however, he did not receive a degree. During the early part of that decade, Martin's work towards increasing regulation of the stock market led to his election to the NYSE's board of governors in 1935. There, he worked with the U.S. Securities and Exchange Commission (SEC) to reestablish confidence in the stock market and prevent future crashes. He eventually became president of the New York Stock Exchange at age 31, leading newspapers to label him the "boy wonder of Wall Street." Like his tenure as governor on the exchange, Martin's presidency focused on cooperating with the SEC to increase regulation of the exchange.

During World War II he was drafted into the United States Army as a private and rose to the rank of colonel. While in the service, he supervised the disposal of raw materials on the Munitions Allocation Board. He was also a liaison between the Army and Congress, as well as the supervisor of the lend-lease program with the Soviet Union.

Career

Director of the Export-Import Bank
Martin's return to civilian life was also a return to the financial world, but this time it was in the Federal government. Harry S. Truman, a fellow Democrat, appointed Martin director of the Export-Import Bank, which he operated for three years (1946-1949). It was at this institution that he was publicly viewed as a "hard banker." He insisted that loans be sound, secure investments; on that principle he opposed the State Department on multiple occasions for making loans that he saw as being politically motivated. On those grounds he would not permit the Export-Import Bank to be used as a fund for international relief.

Martin left the Export-Import bank when he was summoned to the Treasury to serve as assistant secretary for monetary affairs. Martin served at the Treasury for about two years when its conflict with the Federal Reserve Board reached its climax. During the period immediately preceding the final negotiations with the Fed, Secretary of the Treasury John W. Snyder was hospitalized. In this situation, Martin became the chief negotiator for the Treasury. From the Treasury's perspective, Martin was a valuable representative, for he had a thorough understanding of the Federal Reserve System and of financial markets. Furthermore, he was viewed as an ally of Truman, who strongly opposed the Fed's independence. During negotiations, Martin re-established communication between the Treasury and Fed, which has been forbidden by Snyder.

Chairman of the Federal Reserve Board
With Robert Rouse, Woodlief Thomas, and Winfield Riefler of the Fed, Martin negotiated the 1951 Accord. The Federal Open Market Committee (FOMC) and Secretary Snyder accepted the Accord, and it was approved by both institutions. The Chairman of the Board of Governors at the time of ratification was Thomas B. McCabe (1893–1982), who would officially resign from his position just six days after the statement of the Accord was released.
The Truman Administration saw the resignation of McCabe as the perfect opportunity to regain control of the Fed almost immediately after it had supposedly become independent. Truman appointed Martin to serve as the next Chairman of the Board of Governors, and the Senate approved his appointment on March 21, 1951.

Contrary to Truman's expectations, however, Martin guarded the Fed's independence, not just through Truman's administration but also through the four succeeding administrations. To the present day, his term as chairman is the longest term in the history of the Fed. For nearly two decades, Martin would achieve global recognition as the world's most important central banker. He was able to pursue independent monetary policies while still paying heed to the desires of various presidential administrations. Although the objectives of Martin's monetary policy were low inflation and economic stability, he rejected the idea that the Fed could pursue its policies based on a single indicator (an example of oversimplification) and instead made policy decisions by examining a wide array of economic data. As chairman, he institutionalized this strategy in the proceedings of the FOMC, gathering the opinions of all governors and presidents within the System before making decisions. As a result, his decisions were often supported by unanimous votes on the FOMC. The task of the Federal Reserve, he famously said, is "to take away the punch bowl just as the party gets going," that is, raise interest rates just when the economy reaches peak activity after a recession.

Martin was selected administrator-designate of the Emergency Stabilization Agency, part of a secret group created by President Dwight D. Eisenhower in 1958 that would serve in the event of a national emergency, and that became known as the Eisenhower Ten.

After the presidential election of 1960, Republican Party candidate Richard Nixon blamed his defeat on Martin's tight-money policies.

Martin was elected to the American Academy of Arts and Sciences in 1963 and the American Philosophical Society in 1972.

In 1966 he underwent successful prostate surgery.

Externally, Martin was perceived to be the dominant decision-maker at the Fed but this is only a perception. Throughout his tenure, he defended the right of the Fed to take actions that would sometimes conflict with presidential goals. He regularly asserted that the Fed is responsible to the US Congress and not to the White House. Lacking confidence in Martin, Richard Nixon expected him to resign at the outset of the new administration in 1969, but Martin chose to remain in his post. Pursuing a tight-money policy to suppress inflation, by mid-1969 Martin ran afoul of Nixon's concern that the Fed was in danger of pushing the nation into economic recession, a belief that had been publicly stated by conservative economist Milton Friedman. At a White House meeting on October 15, 1969, Nixon confronted Martin over his tight-money policy, but Martin declined to yield. Two days later, the White House announced that Arthur Burns would replace Martin as chairman of the Federal Reserve on Feb. 1, 1970. 

Martin ended his tenure as Chairman of the Board of Governors on January 30, 1970. On that day, his career in public service ended, but he continued to work, holding a variety of directorships of corporations and nonprofit institutions, such as the Rockefeller Brothers Fund.

Martin was an avid tennis player who played tennis nearly every day on the tennis court located outside the Federal Reserve Board Building in Washington, D.C. Martin would go on to serve as president of the National Tennis Foundation and chair of the International Tennis Hall of Fame after retiring from the Federal Reserve.

He died of a heart attack at his home in Washington, D.C., on July 28, 1998, at the age of 91.

Legacy
The 1974 Federal Reserve Annex next to the Eccles Building is named for him.

See also
 History of the United States (1945–1964)
 History of the United States (1964–1980)
 Bretton Woods system

References

Further reading
 Portions of this article are based on public domain text from the Federal Reserve Bank of Richmond.

External links
Digital collection of documents from the William McChesney Martin Jr. Papers at the Missouri History Museum
Statements and Speeches of William McChesney Martin Jr.
Calendar of William McChesney Martin Jr. from his time as Chairman of the Board of Governors of the Federal Reserve System
William McChesney Martin at International Tennis Hall of Fame 

1906 births
1998 deaths
Burials at Bellefontaine Cemetery
20th-century American businesspeople
Businesspeople from St. Louis
Chairs of the Federal Reserve
Columbia Graduate School of Arts and Sciences alumni
Eisenhower administration personnel
International Tennis Hall of Fame inductees
Lyndon B. Johnson administration personnel
Kennedy administration personnel
Nixon administration personnel
Presidents of the New York Stock Exchange
Truman administration personnel
Yale University alumni
Members of the American Philosophical Society